Nguyễn Quốc Huân (born October 2, 1981 in Hanoi) is a Vietnamese taekwondo practitioner, who competed in the men's flyweight category. He claimed a silver medal in the 58-kg division at the 2005 Southeast Asian Games in Manila, Philippines, and finished fifth at the 2004 Summer Olympics, representing his nation Vietnam. Nguyen is also the elder brother and a personal coach of Nguyen Quoc Cuong, who claimed the bronze medal in the boys' 55 kg category at the inaugural Youth Olympic Games in Singapore in 2010.

Nguyen qualified for the Vietnamese squad in the men's flyweight class (58 kg) at the 2004 Summer Olympics in Athens, by granting a berth and placing fifth from the Asian Olympic Qualifying Tournament in Bangkok, Thailand. Nguyen edged past Russia's Seyfula Magomedov in his opening match 12–10, and then yielded a startling 4–2 victory over his British opponent Paul Green in the quarterfinals. Fighting against his Mexico's Óscar Salazar in the semifinals, Nguyen had collected a knee injury which his Mexican opponent ruthlessly exploited and ended the match in a painful 0–8 defeat. In the repechage, Nguyen slipped his chance for Vietnam's first Olympic medal at these Games after he was cautiously beaten by Spain's Juan Antonio Ramos 0–8 in his first playoff, relegating Nguyen to fifth.

References

External links
 

1981 births
Living people
Vietnamese male taekwondo practitioners
Olympic taekwondo practitioners of Vietnam
Taekwondo practitioners at the 2004 Summer Olympics
Taekwondo practitioners at the 2002 Asian Games
Sportspeople from Hanoi
Southeast Asian Games silver medalists for Vietnam
Southeast Asian Games medalists in taekwondo
Competitors at the 2005 Southeast Asian Games
Asian Games competitors for Vietnam
21st-century Vietnamese people